Fucile is a surname. Notable people with the surname include:

Jorge Fucile (born 1984), Uruguayan footballer
Paolo Fucile (born 1981), Italian sport wrestler